Zimbabwe became a full member of the International Cricket Council (ICC) on 6 July 1992, thereby gaining the right to play Test matches. It had previously become an associate member of the ICC on 21 July 1981, a year after the country's internationally recognised independence. Before this, Rhodesia had competed in the South African Currie Cup domestic competition. Since joining the ICC, Zimbabwe have had seven Test captains, fourteen One Day International captains and two Twenty20 captains, along with a number of youth captains.

Before becoming a full member of the ICC, Zimbabwe played in the 1983 Cricket World Cup, when, under the captaincy of Duncan Fletcher, they beat Australia, and in the 1987 Cricket World Cup under the captaincy of John Traicos, who had previously played Test cricket for South Africa. Upon full membership, David Houghton captained the side in Zimbabwe's first Test matches, as well as in the 1992 Cricket World Cup. Andy Flower, the most successful batsman Zimbabwe has produced, captained the side to their first Test win against Pakistan in 1995. He was followed as captain by Alistair Campbell. Under his captaincy, the side achieved its first Test series win in 1998 and, in the 1999 Cricket World Cup, passed the first round for the first time.

After Campbell's resignation for "personal reasons", fast bowler Heath Streak became captain. While Test success—except against newcomers Bangladesh—remained elusive, the side once again reached the second round of the 2003 Cricket World Cup, when they co-hosted the tournament. Not long after this tournament, however, the Zimbabwe Cricket Union sacked Streak, prompting 14 other players to walk out, leaving Tatenda Taibu as captain in the age of 20
. During his tenure as captain, the side suffered its first defeat to Bangladesh and failed to win a single Test. Further political problems led to Taibu's resignation in 2006. At this point, Zimbabwe withdrew from playing Test matches. Since the Test withdrawal, several players have captained the one day side, although none has achieved significant success. The side is once again competing in the South African domestic competition under the captaincy of Hamilton Masakadza.

Men's cricket

Test match captains

As of February 2023, 12 cricketers have captained the Zimbabwean cricket team for at least one Test match. The table of results is complete to the second Test against West Indies on 14 February 2023, the last Test in which Zimbabwe have played. Where a player has a dagger (†) next to a Test match series in which he captained at least one Test, that denotes that player deputised for the appointed captain or was appointed for a minor proportion in a series.

Zimbabwe played their first Test match, after regaining their Test status, against Bangladesh at the Harare Sports Club in Harare. The only Test started on Thursday 4 August 2011. Bangladesh won the toss and elected to field first. Zimbabwe won the Test on day five by 130 runs. Since then they won three Tests more, two against Bangladesh and one against Pakistan.

One Day International captains

As of January 2023, 23 cricketers have captained the Zimbabwean cricket team for at least one One Day International.The table of results is complete up to the third and final ODI against Ireland in January 2023.

1Andy Flower and Grant Flower are brothers.

Twenty20 International captains
Two cricketers have captained the Zimbabwean cricket team for at least one Twenty20 international.The table of results is complete up to the third and final match against Scotland in September 2021.

Youth cricket

Test match captains

Two cricketers have captained the Zimbabwean Under-19 cricket team for at least one under-19 Test match.

Youth One-Day International captains

Ten cricketers have captained the Zimbabwean Under-19 cricket team for at least one Under-19 One Day International.

ICC Trophy

The ICC Trophy is the leading one-day tournament from non-Test teams, and Zimbabwe participated in the tournament before they gained Test status in 1992. Two cricketers captained Zimbabwe in the ICC Trophy.

Notes

References
General

 

 
 
 

Specific

National
Captains
Zimbabwe